James M. Kisner, Jr. (March 26, 1947 – June 26, 2008) was an American novelist and short story writer, primarily of horror.

Biography

Early life and education
James M. Kisner, Jr. was born on March 26, 1947, in Evansville, Indiana to Norma and James M. Kisner. He had one brother, Dan, and graduated from Bosse High School in 1965. He earned a Bachelor of Arts and a Master of Arts degree in English at Indiana University.

Career
Kisner began his career in advertising and wrote part-time, eventually leaving advertising to write full-time. His first novel, Nero's Vice, was published in 1981. He also published under the pseudonyms Martin James and Eric Flanders.

Marriage and children
Kisner married the former Carole Kleckner in 1969. The couple had fraternal twins, James M. Kisner, III and Jayne M. Kendall. Later in life, he married his second wife, Phyllis Kisner.

Death and afterward
James Kisner died at his home in Evansville due to accidental carbon monoxide poisoning. His wife, Phyllis Kisner, age 59, also died in the accident.

Published works

Novels
Nero's Vice, Beaufort, 1981
Slice of Life, Zebra, 1982
Strands, Leisure, 1988
Night Glow (as Martin James), Pinnacle, 1989
Zombie House (as Martin James), Pinnacle, 1990
Poison Pen, Zebra, 1990
Earth Blood, Zebra, 1990
The Quagmire, Zebra, 1991
The Forever Children (as Eric Flanders), Zebra, 1992
Night Blood (as Eric Flanders), Zebra, 1993
Tower of Evil, Leisure, 1994

Short stories
"The Litter", Masques 2 (1987)
"Manny Agonistes", Scare Care (1989)
"The Willies" (1989)
"Something Extra" (1990) (with J.N. Williamson)
"Self-Esteem" (1991)
"The Defiance of the Ugly by the Merely Repulsive" (1993)
"Ground Water", The Earth Strikes Back (1994)
"God-Less Men" (1995)

Anthologies containing short stories by James Kisner:
Masques 3 (1989)
Urban Horrors (1990)
Short Sharp Shocks (1990)
Hotter Blood: More Tales of Erotic Horror (1991)
Predators (1993)
Vampire Detectives (1995)
Southern Blood: Vampire Stories from the American South (1997)
Vampire Slayers: Stories of Those Who Dare to Take Back the Night (1999)

References

External links

1947 births
2008 deaths
American horror writers
20th-century American novelists
Indiana University alumni
Deaths from carbon monoxide poisoning
Writers from Evansville, Indiana
American male novelists
American male short story writers
20th-century American short story writers
20th-century American male writers
Novelists from Indiana